Encap may refer to:
 EnCap, a proposal to build golf courses and homes on remediated landfills in the New Jersey Meadowlands
 EnCap Investments, an American private equity firm
 Encap Package Management System
 Euro NCAP, a European car safety performance assessment programme